Pearson's Chapel was an unincorporated community in Houston County, Texas, now a ghost town,  west of Lovelady. Only a Baptist church remains in the area. It was located at the intersection of FM 1280,  FM 3151, and the old Huntsville Road

Education
The community of Pearson's Chapel is served by the Lovelady Independent School District.

Notable residents
Charles Harrelson, the infamous hitman, grew up 1 mile from Pearson's Chapel.

References

External links

Cities in Texas
Cities in Houston County, Texas